George Joji Miyasaki (1935-2013) was a painter and printmaker active in the abstract expressionist movement.  He was born in Kalopa, Hawaii and moved to California in 1953.  He received a B.F.A. and a B.A.Ed. from the California College of the Arts in 1957 and an M.F.A. from the same institution in 1958, studying under Richard Diebenkorn and Nathan Oliveira.  After teaching at the California College of the Arts and Stanford University, he was appointed a full professor at the University of California, Berkeley in 1964.  In 1960, Willem de Kooning visited Miyasaki's studio to try his hand at lithography.  De Kooning, with the help of Miyasaki and Nathan Oliveira, created at least two abstract lithographs.

Miyasaki's paintings and lithographs from the 1950s, such as Green Landscape, in the collection of the Honolulu Museum of Art, are typical of abstract expressionism.  In the 1960s, his work began to incorporate well defined forms, an example of which is Red Eye from 1963.  The Art Institute of Chicago, the British Museum (London), the Brooklyn Museum, the Honolulu Museum of Art the Metropolitan Museum of Art, the Museum of Fine Arts, Boston, the Museum of Modern Art (New York City), the National Gallery of Art (Washington, D.C), the Philadelphia Museum of Art, the San Francisco Museum of Modern Art, and the Whitney Museum of American Art (New York City) are among the public collections holding work by George Miyasaki.

Footnotes

1935 births
2013 deaths
Painters from Hawaii
20th-century American painters
Printmakers from Hawaii
American artists of Japanese descent
20th-century American printmakers
University of California, Berkeley faculty
21st-century American painters